Belba is a genus of mites belonging to family Damaeidae. The genus was established by Carl von Heyden in 1826. Notaspis corynopus (Hermann, 1804) was the type species. Species that are part of the genus can be found in Eurasia and North America.

Behaviour

Members of the genus Belba are fungivores. Some species have been concluded to prefer a narrow temperature range of 11°C – 15°C.

List of species

The following species are considered to be part of the genus:

See also

Jordbrugrotta
List of fauna of Batu Caves
Oribatida

References

Further reading

External links

 – Family of the genus Belba
Damaeidae Species Listing in Joel Hallan's Biology Catalog by Dr. Heinrich Schatz

 
Acari genera
Taxa named by Carl von Heyden